Mooladhanam (translation: Capital) is a 1969 Indian Malayalam-language film, directed by P. Bhaskaran, written by Thoppil Bhasi and produced by M. Azim. The film stars Sathyan, Prem Nazir, Sharada and Jayabharathi in the lead roles. The film had musical score by G. Devarajan. Cinematography was handled by P. R. Ramalingam.

The film is set amidst the Communist movement in Kerala during the 1960s.

Cast

Prem Nazir as Mammootty
Sathyan as Ravi
Sharada as Sharada
Ambika Sukumaran as Malathy
Jayabharathi as Nabeeza
Adoor Bhasi as Kuruppu
Manavalan Joseph as I.D Kasimpilla
Sankaradi as Hassanar
Sreelatha Namboothiri as Chinnamma
C.A. Balan
K. P. Ummer as Madhu
Kottayam Chellappan as Sharada's Brother
Paravoor Bharathan as Nanu

Soundtrack
The music was composed by G. Devarajan and the lyrics were written by P. Bhaskaran.

References

External links
 

1969 films
1960s Malayalam-language films
Films directed by P. Bhaskaran